Teresa Francisca Benitez-Thompson (born July 25, 1978) is an American politician and former Democratic member of the Nevada Assembly, first elected February 7, 2011 to represent District 27 in Washoe County. She was crowned Miss Nevada 2002 and placed third runner-up at the Miss America 2003 pageant.

Background
Benitez-Thompson earned her B.A. from the University of Nevada, Reno and her master's degree in social work from the University of Michigan. By profession she is a licensed social worker at a hospice company. Benitez-Thompson is married to KOLO-TV chief meteorologist, former KRNV-DT chief meteorologist and former KTVN meteorologist Jeff Thompson and has 4 children. Her father is of Mexican descent.

Elections
2020 Benitez-Thompson was unopposed in the 2020 Democratic primary and won the general election with 18,559 votes (58.47%) against Republican candidate Barb Hawn.
2018 Benitez-Thompson was unopposed in both the primary and general elections.
2016 Benitez-Thompson was unopposed in the primary.  She won the general election with 15,080 votes (56.56%) against Republican candidate Bonnie Weber, who later became a member of the Reno City Council.
2014 Benitez-Thompson was unopposed in the primary and won the general election with 7,793 votes (53.53%) against Republican nominee Rex Crouch.
2012 Benitez-Thompson was unopposed in the primary and won the general election with 14,160 votes (57.76%) against Republican nominee Tom Taber, who had previously run for the Assembly in 1990.
2010 When Democratic Assemblywoman Sheila Leslie ran for Nevada Senate and left the Assembly seat open, Benitez-Thompson won the primary with 1,451 votes (55.92%) against Byllie Andrews. She won the general election with 6,951 votes (63.57%) against Republican nominee Gabe Jurado.

References

External links
 Official page at the Nevada Legislature
 Campaign website
 

|-

1978 births
21st-century American politicians
21st-century American women politicians
American politicians of Mexican descent
American social workers
Beauty queen-politicians
Democratic Party members of the Nevada Assembly
Hispanic and Latino American state legislators in Nevada
Hispanic and Latino American women in politics
Living people
Miss America 2003 delegates
Miss Nevada winners
People from Ventura, California
Politicians from Reno, Nevada
University of Michigan School of Social Work alumni
University of Nevada, Reno alumni
Women state legislators in Nevada